KOLT-FM (100.7 FM) is a radio station broadcasting a country music format. Licensed to Cheyenne, Wyoming, United States, the station serves the Ft. Collins-Greeley area.  The station is currently owned by iHeartMedia, Inc., through licensee iHM Licenses, LLC.

History
The station was previously known as KLEN-FM, beginning on 1979-09-26. On 1980-11-04, the station changed its call sign to KKAZ, on 1996-12-09 to KOLZ, and on 2016-03-30 to the current KOLT-FM.

References

External links

OLT-FM
Country radio stations in the United States
Radio stations established in 1979
1979 establishments in Wyoming
IHeartMedia radio stations